Qameshlu (also Romanized as Qameshlū; also known as Gomeshlū, Gowmeshlū, Kūkūshlu, Kūshgūnlū, Kushkunu, Kūshlū, and Qīmishlu) is a village in Aq Bolagh Rural District, Sojas Rud District, Khodabandeh County, Zanjan Province, Iran. At the 2006 census, its population was 77, in 12 families.

References 

Populated places in Khodabandeh County